is a train station located in Sasebo, Nagasaki Prefecture, Japan. It is on the Nishi-Kyūshū Line which has been operated by the third-sector Matsuura Railway since 1988.

Lines 
 Matsuura Railway
 Nishi-Kyūshū Line

Station layout 
The station consists of one ground-level island platform with two tracks.

Adjacent stations

See also 
 List of railway stations in Japan

References

External links 
 
 Matsuura Railway 
 Navitime station timetable 
 Yahoo! Transit Japan 

Stations of Matsuura Railway
Railway stations in Japan opened in 1931